Democratic Senate or Senators for Democracy was an electoral alliance in Spain formed by the Spanish Socialist Workers' Party (PSOE), Democratic Left (ID) and Liberal Alliance (AL) to contest the 1977 Spanish Senate election in a number of constituencies, including Badajoz, Burgos, Granada, Madrid, Málaga, Murcia and Oviedo. In the latter, the Communist Party of Spain (PCE) also participated.

Composition

References

1977 establishments in Spain
1977 disestablishments in Spain
Defunct political party alliances in Spain
Political parties established in 1977
Political parties disestablished in 1977